The Military ranks of Guinea are the military insignia used by the Republic of Guinea Armed Forces. Being a former colony of France, Guinea shares a rank structure similar to that of France.

Commissioned officer ranks
The rank insignia of commissioned officers.

Other ranks
The rank insignia of non-commissioned officers and enlisted personnel.

References

External links
 
 

Guinea
Military of Guinea